Mumbai–Pune Shatabdi was a train in Shatabdi series of Indian Railways. This was the first dedicated high priority train of Indian Railways between Mumbai and Pune. This was fully air conditioned train. This train used to run in morning 6:45 AM from Mumbai and reach Pune at 09.45 AM and leave Pune at 5:45 PM and reach Mumbai at 8:45 PM in evening. This train was replaced by Mumbai–Pune Intercity Express due to low response. The Intercity also has non-AC compartments. Intercity leaves Mumbai at 6:40 AM and arrives Pune at 9:57 AM and leaves Pune at 5:55 PM and arrives Mumbai at 9:05 PM.

This train was extremely popular as it was initially the fastest and most comfortable way to travel between Mumbai and Pune. With the opening of the Mumbai–Pune Expressway in 2003, demand dropped considerably for luxury train services. In 2004, the service was cancelled.

See also

 Sister trains Mumbai–Pune:

References

External links
 Mumbai–Pune train timetable punediary.com

Transport in Mumbai
Transport in Pune
Rail transport in Maharashtra
Mumbai–Pune trains
Shatabdi Express trains
Defunct trains in India
Railway services introduced in 1995